Niki Linardou (Greek: Νίκη Λινάρδου, June 1939 – 25 September 2012) was a Greek film and stage actress. She was the second wife of Alekos Sakellarios. After their marriage she worked as a television producer. As an actress appeared in many famous Greek films: The Fortune Teller (1956), We Have Only One Life (1958), The Policeman of the 16th Precinct (1959), A Matter of Earnestness (1965) and Kalos ilthe to dollario (1967). Her real name was Androniki "Mpempi" Koula" which she was used since 1962.

Selected filmography
 Laterna, ftohia kai filotimo (1955) ..... Roma girl
  The Fortune Teller (1956) ..... Marikaki
 I kyra mas i mami (1958) ..... Voula
 Astero (1959) ..... Maro
 The Policeman of the 16th Precinct (1959) ..... maid
 Maiden's Cheek (1959) ..... Xanthopoulou
 Ta kitrina gantia (1960) ..... Anna
 Otan leipei i gata (1962) ..... Elli
 Polytehnitis kai erimospitis (1963) ..... Maria
 A Matter of Earnestness (1965) ..... Aliki Mavrogialourou
 The Countess of Corfu (1972) ..... Maria

External links 
 Νίκη Λινάρδου, www.retrodb.gr
 Niki Linardou on IMDb

1939 births
2012 deaths
Greek film actresses
Greek stage actresses
Greek television producers
Greek women television producers